Emm wie Meikel is a German television series. It is a puppet show focusing on a bearded mouse character, Meikel Katzengreis. Some later segments included another puppet character named DeMos, the foreign cousin of Meikel.

See also
List of German television series

External links
 

1975 German television series debuts
1978 German television series endings
German children's television series
German television shows featuring puppetry
German-language television shows
Das Erste original programming